Verchere or Verchère is a surname. Notable people with the surname include:

Graham Verchere (born 2002), Canadian actor
Jean-Baptiste Verchère de Reffye (1821–1880), French artillery general
Patrice Verchère (born 1973), member of the National Assembly of France